James Gordon Easson (2 July 1928 – 26 November 2009) was a Scottish footballer, who played as a goalkeeper for East Fife and Worcester City.

Easson was born in Windygates on 2 July 1928. He made his first team debut for East Fife in the 1950 Scottish Cup Final. This happened because their first two choice goalkeepers, John Niven and John McGarrity, were both injured. Easson conceded a goal within 30 seconds and East Fife went on to lose 3–0.

Easson died in Kirkcaldy on 26 November 2009, at the age of 81.

References

Sources

1928 births
2009 deaths
Footballers from Fife
Association football goalkeepers
Scottish footballers
East Fife F.C. players
Worcester City F.C. players
Scottish Football League players